Stein Henrik Tuff (born 16 September 1974) is a Norwegian former ski jumper.

In the World Cup he finished once among the top 10, with a tenth place from Kuopio in February 1996. He won the Continental Cup in the 1995/96 season.

He participated in the 1994 Winter Olympics in Lillehammer, where he finished 43rd in the large hill.

References

1974 births
Living people
Sportspeople from Trondheim
Norwegian male ski jumpers
Ski jumpers at the 1994 Winter Olympics
Olympic ski jumpers of Norway